Charles Sherrod Hatfield (June 29, 1882 – February 9, 1950) was an associate judge of the United States Court of Customs and Patent Appeals.

Education and career

Born on June 29, 1882, in West Millgrove, Ohio, Hatfield received an Artium Baccalaureus degree from Hanover College, and a Bachelor of Laws from the Ohio State University Moritz College of Law. He was a prosecuting attorney for Wood County, Ohio beginning in 1907. He later entered private practice until 1923. He was also a lecturer for the National University Law School (now Georgetown Law).

Federal judicial service

Hatfield was nominated by President Warren G. Harding on March 2, 1923, to an Associate Judge seat on the United States Court of Customs Appeals (United States Court of Customs and Patent Appeals from March 2, 1929) vacated by Associate Judge George Ewing Martin. He was confirmed by the United States Senate on March 3, 1923, and received his commission the same day. His service terminated on February 9, 1950, due to his death in Washington, D.C.

References

Sources
 

1882 births
1950 deaths
Hanover College alumni
Judges of the United States Court of Customs and Patent Appeals
Ohio State University Moritz College of Law alumni
Ohio lawyers
People from Wood County, Ohio
United States Article I federal judges appointed by Warren G. Harding
20th-century American judges